Philip David Radford (born January 2, 1976) is an American activist who served as the executive director of Greenpeace USA. He is the founder and President of Progressive Power Lab, an organization that incubates companies and non-profits that build capacity for progressive organizations, including a donor advisory organization Champion.us, the Progressive Multiplier Fund and Membership Drive. Radford is a co-founder of the Democracy Initiative, was founder and executive director of Power Shift, and is a board member of the Mertz Gilmore Foundation. He has a background in grassroots organizing, corporate social responsibility, climate change, and clean energy.

Early life and education
Radford began his environmental activism as a high school student at Oak Park and River Forest High School in Oak Park, a Chicago suburb, volunteering for an environmental justice campaign to stop the building of trash incinerators in the West Side of Chicago near his family's Oak Park home.

His first job as a grassroots organizer came as a canvasser for Illinois PIRG. While studying political science and business at Washington University in St. Louis, he directed campaign and canvass offices during summers for the Fund for Public Interest Research for clients including the Human Rights Campaign, PIRGIM, and Ohio PIRG and worked part-time during school for the Sierra Club. After graduating college in 1998, Radford became a lead organizer at Green Corps, the field school for environmental organizing.

Radford received his B.A. from Washington University in St. Louis in 1998.

Career

Field director of Ozone Action 

From 1999 to 2001 Radford was field director for Ozone Action, an organization dedicated to working on the atmospheric threats of global warming and ozone depletion. As field director, Radford planned and executed a number of grassroots campaigns, including a campaign during the 2000 presidential primaries, which was the initial impetus for Senator John McCain sponsoring the Climate Stewardship Act.

Radford also managed the grassroots mobilization for the Global Warming Divestiture Campaign, which resulted in Ford, General Motors, Texaco, and other companies ending their funding the Global Climate Coalition, which spread misinformation about global warming. According to The New York Times, the result of the campaign was "the latest sign of divisions within heavy industry over how to respond to global warming."

Founder of Power Shift 

In 2001, Radford founded Power Shift, a non-governmental organization dedicated to driving clean energy market breakthroughs and building the grassroots base to stop global warming.

As executive director of Power Shift, Radford worked closely with the cities of San Diego, Chula Vista, California, and Berkeley, California, as well as nine other municipalities, to secure investments for installation of solar energy systems and implementation of energy efficiency measures in municipal buildings. Radford also helped to convince Citigroup to adopt innovative new means of financing clean energy infrastructure for wind and solar installations that made them affordable to average Americans.

Leading Greenpeace USA 

In 2009, at the age of 33, Radford was selected as the youngest ever executive director of Greenpeace. Radford's tenure at Greenpeace USA is best known for convincing over 100 corporations to change their environmental practices; exposing the anti-environmental influence of the Koch Brothers, making them a household name; increasing the organization's net income by 80%; launching the organization's grassroots organizing and significantly growing the canvass programs; and serving as a founder of the Democracy Initiative, a national coalition of major unions, environmental groups, civil rights and government reform organizations working for universal voter registration, to get money out of politics, and to reform Senate rules. In September 2013, Radford announced that he would step down on April 30, 2014, once he had completed five years of service as executive director.

New York Times reporter Andrew Revkin referred to a Greenpeace campaign during Radford's tenure as "Activism at Its Best."

Ben Jealous, former president and chief executive officer of the NAACP as well as co-founder of the Democracy Initiative with Radford, described Radford at the helm of Greenpeace as "a modern movement building giant. He has built powerful diverse coalitions to bolster the fights for the environment and voting rights. In the process he has shown himself to be unmatched in mobilizing everyday people to fund their movements directly." Environmental leader Bill McKibben stated: "During Radford's tenure, Greenpeace has been helping the whole environmental movement shift back towards its roots: local, connected, tough."

Before becoming executive director of Greenpeace USA, Radford served as the director of the organization's Grassroots Program. In that capacity, he directed and significantly grew the organization's street canvass and launched and directed the door-to-door canvasses, online-to-offline organizing team, social media team, the Greenpeace Student Network, and the Greenpeace Semester. Under Radford, the street and door-to-door canvassing programs grew to include nearly 400 canvassers in almost 20 cities across the country and was responsible for doubling the organization's budget.

Progressive Power Lab 
After leaving Greenpeace, Radford launched Progressive Power Lab, which starts and manages organizations that work to move millions of dollars and people into progressive causes. Through Progressive Power Lab, Radford launched the Progressive Multiplier Fund, Membership Drive, a Salesforce App developer which built Apps including The Field, and Champion.us, a donor advisor firm for small donors focused on democracy and climate change.

Influencing Corporations

During Radford's tenure at Greenpeace, his theory of change shifted from viewing governments as arbitrators between public and private interests on environmental issues, to finding that most governments are captured by industry. Rather than fighting first for new laws, which could be blocked by industries, he has focused on pressuring large companies to change their practices and enlisted them as allies in pushing for strong environmental protections. Examples include Greenpeace campaigns that convinced Apple Inc. and other tech companies to shift to 100% clean energy and lobby utilities and regulators to make that possible, as well as work to protect both the Indonesian rainforest and the Bering Sea Canyons. Radford argues that the combination of creating industry champions and "outside pressure" focused on the government are the keys to passing new laws to protect the environment. However, Radford has also been a vocal leader calling for the United States to pass campaign finance reform and respect all Americans' voting rights to shift power in politics from corporations towards people and fulfill "the promise of American democracy." Radford played a major role in several initiatives to influence corporations such as the Global Climate Coalition, Citigroup, Kimberley-Clark, Asia Pulp and Paper, and the tech industry.

Global Climate Coalition 
Radford managed the grassroots efforts of a national divestment/disinvestment campaign, which forced Ford, General Motors, Texaco, and other companies to stop funding the Global Climate Coalition, which spread misinformation about global warming. Soon thereafter, the GCC ended operations.

Citigroup 
In 2001, while running Power Shift, Radford launched a campaign to push Citibank to offer and promote Energy Efficient Mortgages (EEMs). Citi was "missing the opportunity to help stop global warming by phasing out fossil fuel investments and promoting clean energy now," Radford said. "The irony is that if Citi financed solar for people's homes, solar energy could be made immediately affordable for millions of Americans today." In 2004, Citigroup agreed to offer and promote EEMs for residential wind, energy efficiency, and solar installations that would make clean energy affordable for millions of Americans.

Kimberly-Clark 
Radford oversaw the grassroots mobilization efforts on the Kleercut Campaign in the United States and, later, the entire U.S. component of the global campaign when he became Greenpeace's executive director, targeting Kimberly-Clark for sourcing 22% of its paper pulp from Canadian boreal forests containing 200-year-old trees. The campaign included intervening in Kleenex commercial shoots, convincing twenty-two universities and colleges to take action such as cancelling contracts, recruiting 500 companies to boycott Kimberly-Clark, over 1,000 protests of the company, and more. On August 5, 2009, Kimberly-Clark announced that it would source 40% of its paper fiber from recycled content or other sustainable sources – a 71% increase from 2007 levels. The demand created by Kimberly-Clark for sustainably logged fiber was greater than the supply, enabling the company to convince logging companies to change their practices.

Asia Pulp and Paper 
From 2010 to 2013, Radford managed the Greenpeace team that persuaded major U.S. companies to cancel their contracts with Asia Pulp and Paper (APP) – the world's third largest paper company – to push APP to stop destroying ancient forests. Greenpeace and its allies succeeded in convincing more than 100 corporate customers of APP to sever their ties with the company, including Mattel, Hasbro, Lego, Kmart, IGA, Kroger, Food Lion, National Geographic, and Xerox. The campaign against APP cut nearly 80% of APP's U.S. market. On February 5, 2013, Asia Pulp and Paper announced a deforestation policy protecting Indonesian rainforests. Referring to the victory, New York Times reporter Andrew Revkin heralded the campaign with a piece titled: "Activism at Its Best: Greenpeace's Push to Stop the Pulping of Rainforests".

Tech industry 
On April 21, 2011, Greenpeace released a report highlighting data centers, which consumed up to 2% of all global electricity and this amount was projected to increase. Radford stated "we are concerned that this new explosion in electricity use could lock us into old, polluting energy sources instead of the clean energy available today." Business Insider reported that after Greenpeace USA campaigns, "tech giants like Apple, Google, Facebook, and Salesforce have promised to power their data centers with renewable energy, a pledge that led Duke Energy, the nation's largest power utility and one of the most flagrant emitters of CO2, to begin providing clean energy to win their business."

Deforestation 

In 2014, deforestation in Indonesia, which accounts for 0.1% of the world's surface, caused 4% of global warming pollution. One of the major drivers of deforestation was clearing the forest to grow palm oil plantations. Under Radford, the Greenpeace USA team persuaded Procter & Gamble, Colgate Palmolive, Mondelez, and other major companies to demand sustainably grown palm oil.

Major U.S. supermarkets 
Under Radford, Greenpeace ran a campaign targeting supermarket chains to convince them to stop selling threatened fish, adopt sustainable seafood policies, and lobby for policies such as marine reserves to protect the oceans. Whole Foods, Safeway Inc., Wegmans, Target, Harris Teeter, Meijer, and Kroger implemented sustainable seafood purchasing policies; Trader Joe's, Aldi, Costco, Target Corporation, and A&P have dramatically cut the threatened fish that they sell; Whole Foods, Safeway Inc., Trader Joe's, Walmart, and Hy-Vee introduced sustainably caught canned tuna; and Wegmans, Whole Foods, Safeway Inc., Target, and Trader Joe's have lobbied for strong ocean policies, such as protecting the Ross Sea and Bering Sea Canyons as marine reserves.

Bibliography

Articles (partial list) 
"Peace as the Greenpeace Way" May 7, 2009, Washington Times
"Banking on Coal; Why is the World Bank subsidizing one of the planet's dirtiest fuels?", December 9, 2009, Foreign Policy
"Nestle to save orangutans, tropical forests, and our climate", May 18, 2010, Grist
"A Call for Direct Action in the Climate Movement", Phil Radford, Bill McKibben, Rebecca Tarbotton, September 8, 2010, Yes!
"Shining Light on Obama's Tar Sands Pipeline Decision", Phil Radford and Daryl Hannah, September 29, 2011, Huffington Post
"If You Want to Breathe Clean Air, Senate Reform and Democracy Matter", July 15, 2013, Huffington Post
"The Environmental Case for a Path to Citizenship", March 14, 2013, Huffington Post
"Don’t Let America Get Fracked", Phil Radford and Mark Ruffalo, April 25, 2013 CNN.com
"How Shell is trying to send a chill through activist groups across the country", Phil Radford and Benjamin Jealous June 17, 2013, Grist.org
"A Philanthropic Stimulus Plan for Advocacy Nonprofits", Phil Radford, Gara LaMarche, and Sonal Shah, March 2020, Chronicle of Philanthropy

References

External links

Phil Radford's blog at Huffington Post
Phil Radford's blog at Grist.org

People associated with Greenpeace
Climate activists
American naturalists
HuffPost writers and columnists
American conservationists
American ecologists
Living people
Sustainability advocates
Environmental bloggers
1976 births
American bloggers
Environmental writers
Writers from Chicago
Washington University in St. Louis alumni
American chief executives
Sierra Club people
Consumer rights activists
Youth empowerment people
People associated with energy
Appropriate technology advocates
People associated with nuclear power
Green thinkers
American anti–nuclear power activists
People associated with solar power
Businesspeople from Washington, D.C.
American nonprofit executives
21st-century American businesspeople
Renewable energy commercialization
Environmental ethics
American political activists
Public Citizen
American lobbyists
Hybrid electric vehicle advocates
American social activists
American democracy activists
Writers from Oak Park, Illinois
American community activists
American child activists
Nonviolence advocates